Inju: The Beast in the Shadow (French: Inju, la bête dans l'ombre) is a 2008 film by Barbet Schroeder. The film stars Benoît Magimel and Lika Minamoto and was filmed on location in Tokyo.

The film is based on a 1928 novel by Japanese writer Edogawa Rampo. The novel has been published in English by Kurodahan Press under the title Beast in the Shadows in a dual edition with The Black Lizard.

The film premiered at the Venice Film Festival in August 2008, followed by the Toronto International Film Festival in September, 2008. The film was released in France on September 3, 2008.

Plot
The writer and college professor, Alexandre Fayard, researches and gives lectures about the gruesome literary work of the mysterious Japanese writer Shundei Oe, considered by him to be the master of manipulation. In his underground detective novels, evil always prevails and Shundei Oe has never allowed anyone to see his face. His only image available is a frightening picture on the back of his best-sellers.

Alex travels to Kyoto to promote his successful detective story, that follows the same style of the Shundei Oe, but with a positive message instead. He meets with his publisher, Ken Honda, from the publishing house Hakubunkan, and a geisha who knew the writer. After these finds in his investigation, Alex becomes more determined to find the mysterious writer.

Critical response
Critical reaction to the film after its Venice premiere was mostly negative. Geoffrey Macnab wrote:

Inju, the Beast in the Shadow is a bold but arguably misguided affair....[I]t is pitched somewhere between a B-thriller and Nagisa Oshima's In the Realm of the Senses. Corny plot twists, transgressive sex and self-reflexive asides about cinema sit side by side. Many in Venice found it preposterous and it was given a rough ride by the volatile Italian press.

References

External links

2008 films
French mystery thriller films
Films based on mystery novels
Films directed by Barbet Schroeder
Films based on Japanese novels
Films based on works by Edogawa Ranpo
Films set in Japan
Japan in non-Japanese culture
2000s French films
Japanese mystery thriller films